This is a list of launches made by the Atlas rocket family, derived from the SM-65 Atlas ICBM. The currently operational variant, Atlas V, has flown 81 consecutive missions without failure between October 2007 and January 2022.

Due to the size of the list, it has been split by decade:
 List of Atlas launches (1957–1959)
 List of Atlas launches (1960–1969)
 List of Atlas launches (1970–1979)
 List of Atlas launches (1980–1989)
 List of Atlas launches (1990–1999)
 List of Atlas launches (2000–2009)
 List of Atlas launches (2010–2019)
 List of Atlas launches (2020–2029)

In addition, the variants Atlas LV3C and Atlas LV3B have dedicated lists.

Statistics 

Statistics are up-to-date .

See also 

 List of Falcon 9 and Falcon Heavy launches
 List of Thor and Delta launches
 List of Titan launches

Atlas